The Melbourne Cup
is Australia's major Thoroughbred horse race. Each year internationally bred or owned horses compete in the race alongside local entrants. Since 1882 New Zealand bred horses have won 40 Melbourne Cups, British bred horses have won five cups, US bred horses four, Irish horses two and one Japanese and German bred horse have each won the Cup. The Melbourne Cup is the richest handicap race in the world.

This is a list of the first four placings (from 2006) in the Melbourne Cup, a Thoroughbred horse race at Flemington Racecourse in Melbourne, Australia.

Results

Detailed list of winners

See also

 Melbourne Cup
 List of Melbourne Cup winners
 Victoria Racing Club
 Australian horse-racing
 Melbourne Spring Racing Carnival

Notes

Further reading

External links
 Melbourne Cup - The race that stops the nation

Australian horse racing lists
Flemington Racecourse
Melbourne sport-related lists
Placings
 
History of Melbourne
1861 establishments in Australia